San Nicolò may refer to:

 San Nicolò a Tordino, frazione in the Province of Teramo in the Abruzzo region of Italy
 San Nicolò dei Mendicoli, church, which is located in the sestiere of Dorsoduro in Venice
 San Nicolò l'Arena, Catania, title of both the Roman Catholic church and its adjacent and enormous Benedictine monastery
 San Nicolò, Montecastrilli, Roman Catholic church located in the town of Montecastrilli, in the province of Terni, region of Umbria, Italy
 San Nicolò, Isola Dovarese, Neoclassical-style, Roman Catholic church located on in the town of Isola Dovarese in the province of Cremona, region of Lombardy, Italy
 San Nicolo, Cagli, Roman Catholic, Franciscan church in Cagli, province of Pesaro e Urbino, region of Marche, Italy
 San Nicolò, Padua, Romanesque and Gothic-style, Roman Catholic church in Padua, region of Veneto, Italy
 San Nicolò Gerrei, municipality in the Province of South Sardinia in the Italian region Sardinia, Italy

See also

 San Nicola (disambiguation)
 Nicolò (disambiguation)
 San Niccolò (disambiguation)